The pair distribution function describes the distribution of distances between pairs of particles contained within a given volume.

Overview 
The pair distribution function is used to describe the distribution of objects within a medium (for example, oranges in a crate or nitrogen molecules in a gas cylinder).  If the medium is homogeneous (i.e. every spatial location has identical properties), then there is an equal probability density for finding an object at any position :
,
where  is the volume of the container.  On the other hand, the likelihood of finding pairs of objects at given positions (i.e. the two-body probability density) is not uniform.  For example, pairs of hard balls must be separated by at least the diameter of a ball.  The pair distribution function  is obtained by scaling the two-body probability density function by the total number of objects  and the size of the container:
.
In the common case where the number of objects in the container is large, this simplifies to give:
.

Simple models and general properties 
The simplest possible pair distribution function assumes that all object locations are mutually independent, giving:
,
where  is the separation between a pair of objects.  However, this is inaccurate in the case of hard objects as discussed above, because it does not account for the minimum separation required between objects.  The hole-correction (HC) approximation provides a better model:

where  is the diameter of one of the objects.

Although the HC approximation gives a reasonable description of sparsely packed objects, it breaks down for dense packing.  This may be illustrated by considering a box completely filled by identical hard balls so that each ball touches its neighbours.  In this case, every pair of balls in the box is separated by a distance of exactly  where  is a positive whole number.  The pair distribution for a volume completely filled by hard spheres is therefore a set of Dirac delta functions of the form:
.

Finally, it may be noted that a pair of objects which are separated by a large distance have no influence on each other's position (provided that the container is not completely filled).  Therefore,
.

In general, a pair distribution function will take a form somewhere between the sparsely packed (HC approximation) and the densely packed (delta function) models, depending on the packing density .

Radial distribution function 
Of special practical importance is the radial distribution function, which is independent of orientation. It is a major descriptor for the atomic structure of amorphous materials (glasses, polymers) and liquids. The radial distribution function can be calculated directly from physical measurements like light scattering or x-ray powder diffraction by performing a Fourier Transform.

In Statistical Mechanics the PDF is given by the expression

Applications

Thin Film Pair Distribution Function 

When thin films are disordered, as they are in electronic devices, pair distribution is used so to view the strain and structure-properties of that material or composition. They have these properties that cannot be exploited in the bulk or crystalline form. There is a method with the radial distribution that is able to view the local structure of a disordered thin film of GeSe2.But the creators of this method called a need for a better method to view the mid-range order of disordered films. The creation of thin-film Pair Distribution Function (tfPDF) uses a statistical distribution of a material’s mid-range order that enables viewing important details like the disorder. In this technique, 2D data from a scattering method is integrated and Fourier transformed into 1D data that shows the probability of bonds in that material. TfPDF works best when in conjunction with other characterization methods like transmission electron microscopy. Although a developing methodology, tfPDF can give complete structure-property relationships through a reliable characterization technique.

See also 
 classical-map hypernetted-chain method

References 
Fischer-Colbrie, Bienenstock, Fuoss, Marcus. Phys. Rev. B (1988) 38, 12388

Jensen, K. M., Billinge, S. J. (2015). IUCrJ, 2(5), 481-489. 

Statistical mechanics
Condensed matter physics